Cole Luke (born June 30, 1995) is an American football cornerback who is a free agent. He played college football at Notre Dame and signed with the Carolina Panthers as an undrafted free agent in 2017.

Early life and college
Luke was born on June 30, 1995 in Chandler, Arizona, later attending Hamilton High School. A 4-star recruit, Luke committed to play college football at Notre Dame, over offers from  Arizona State, Michigan, Oklahoma, Texas, Utah, and Washington, among others. In his college career, he recorded 152 tackles, 24 passes defended and 8 interceptions.

Professional career

Carolina Panthers
Luke signed with the Carolina Panthers as an undrafted free agent following the 2017 NFL Draft. He was placed on injured reserve on September 14, 2017 with an ankle injury. On September 1, 2018, Luke was waived but signed to the practice squad the following day.

Luke signed a reserve/future contract with the team on December 31, 2018. He was waived during final roster cuts on August 31, 2019, but signed with the practice squad the following day. He was promoted to the active roster on November 8, 2019. Luke was waived on August 28, 2020.

Washington Football Team
Luke signed with the practice squad of the Washington Football Team on September 7, 2020. He was promoted to the active roster with a two-year contract on November 21, 2020. He was released on August 31, 2021, and re-signed to their practice squad on October 13, 2021, but released six days later.

References

External links
 Washington Football Team bio

1995 births
Living people
Sportspeople from Chandler, Arizona
Players of American football from Arizona
American football cornerbacks
Notre Dame Fighting Irish football players
Carolina Panthers players
Washington Football Team players